The 2011 Desert Diamond Cup (formerly known as the Desert Cup and also known as the FC Tucson Desert Diamond Cup) was a preseason soccer tournament held at Hi Corbett Field in Tucson, Arizona. The tournament, the first edition of the Desert Cup, was held from March 4-5, 2011 and featured two Major League Soccer clubs along two US Club Soccer clubs.

The tournament was won by Sporting Kansas City, who edged the New York Red Bulls on goal differential.

Teams
The following four clubs competed in the tournament:

 FC Tucson from US Club Soccer, hosts (1st appearance) 
 Sporting Kansas City from Major League Soccer (1st appearance)
 New York Red Bulls from Major League Soccer (1st appearance)
 Arizona Sahuaros from the US Club Soccer (1st appearance)

Matches

Final standings

External links
 FC Tucson Official Site 

2011
2011 in American soccer
March 2011 sports events in the United States
2011 in sports in Arizona